Syed Yasin is an ex member of the Karnataka Legislative Assembly. He was the only Muslim candidate fielded by the Indian National Congress in Raichur district in the 2008 election.

References

Indian Muslims
Indian National Congress politicians from Karnataka
Living people
1956 births
Karnataka MLAs 2008–2013